Denise Crusade Ricciardi (born December 16, 1961) is an American politician from New Hampshire. A Republican, she has represented the 9th district of the New Hampshire Senate since 2020, defeating Democratic incumbent Jeanne Dietsch. Ricciardi served on the Bedford town council from 2019 to 2022, and was its vice chair from 2019 to 2021.

References 

Living people
Republican Party New Hampshire state senators
21st-century American politicians
Women state legislators in New Hampshire
21st-century American women politicians
1961 births